Gmina Obsza is a rural gmina (administrative district) in Biłgoraj County, Lublin Voivodeship, in eastern Poland.

The gmina contains part of the protected area called Puszcza Solska Landscape Park.

Villages
Gmina Obsza contains the villages and settlements of Babice, Dorbozy, Obsza, Olchowiec, Wola Obszańska and Zamch.

Neighbouring gminas
Gmina Obsza is bordered by the gminas of Cieszanów, Łukowa, Narol, Stary Dzików, Susiec and Tarnogród.

References
Polish official population figures 2006

Obsza
Biłgoraj County